Nebeska Peak is the rocky peak rising to 2450 m in Sullivan Heights on the east side of Sentinel Range in Ellsworth Mountains, Antarctica.  It is surmounting Pulpudeva Glacier to the north and Hinkley Glacier to the south.

The feature is named after the settlement of Nebeska in southern Bulgaria.

Location
US mapping in 1988, and SCAR Antarctic Digital Database mapping in 2012.

See also
 Mountains in Antarctica

Maps
 Vinson Massif.  Scale 1:250 000 topographic map.  Reston, Virginia: US Geological Survey, 1988.
 Antarctic Digital Database (ADD). Scale 1:250000 topographic map of Antarctica. Scientific Committee on Antarctic Research (SCAR). Since 1993, regularly updated.

References
 Nebeska Peak SCAR Composite Antarctic Gazetteer
 Bulgarian Antarctic Gazetteer Antarctic Place-names Commission (in Bulgarian) 
Basic data (in English)

External links
 Nebeska Peak. Copernix satellite image

Mountains of Ellsworth Land
Bulgaria and the Antarctic